Neolamprologus crassus is a species of cichlid endemic to Lake Tanganyika where it can be found in the southwestern part of the lake, in the waters of the Democratic Republic of the Congo.  This species can reach a length of  TL. It can also be found in the aquarium trade. Some authorities regard this taxon as a synonym of Neolamprologus pulcher.

References

crassus
Fish described in 1989
Taxonomy articles created by Polbot
Endemic fauna of the Democratic Republic of the Congo